Cleft Island is a small island to the north of the Bølingen Islands, lying  southeast of Lichen Island in southern Prydz Bay. The island was plotted from air photos taken by the Lars Christensen Expedition, 1936–37, and called Lorten by Norwegian cartographers. The feature was visited by an Australian National Antarctic Research Expeditions party from the Nella Dan in February 1966 and renamed with reference to the deep channel.

See also 
 List of Antarctic and sub-Antarctic islands

References 

Islands of Princess Elizabeth Land